The Chicago and North Western Railway's Class E-2 was a 4-6-2 "Pacific" type locomotive built by the American Locomotive Company in Schenectady, New York in 1923.  Twelve were originally built, and all were later converted.  Four of these locomotives gained the Class E-2-a designation in late 1934 when they were converted to burn oil instead of coal, upgraded with larger drivers, and had other changes made in order to run at higher speeds in preparation for pulling the Twin Cities–Chicago 400 the next year.  The other eight were converted to Class E-2-b, which was similar except they remained coal-fired.

The E-2-a was among the fastest steam locomotives in the world in 1935. While fast for its day, it was not quite a match for the Milwaukee Road class A and later F7 engines, which ran the rival Hiawatha.

Unlike the Hiawatha engines, the E-2s never ran with streamlined shrouds, though it appeared for a time that they would be replaced by streamlined class E-4 4-6-4 "Hudson" locomotives on the 400 route.  C&NW ordered eight E-4s in 1937, later adding one more order to the total.  However, the railway decided instead to use diesel-electric EMD E3 locomotives for the 400, which replaced the E-2-a engines on the route in 1939.

References

4-6-2 locomotives
E-2 class
ALCO locomotives
Steam locomotives of the United States
Railway locomotives introduced in 1923
Scrapped locomotives
Standard gauge locomotives of the United States
Passenger locomotives